1974 Canadian federal budget may refer to:

 The May 1974 Canadian federal budget
 The November 1974 Canadian federal budget